Coconuts is a coastal locality in the Cassowary Coast Region, Queensland, Australia.

Geography
The Johnstone River forms the southern boundary.

References 

Cassowary Coast Region
Coastline of Queensland
Localities in Queensland